83982 Crantor, prov. designation: , is a centaur in a 1:1 resonance with Uranus, approximately  in diameter. It was discovered on 12 April 2002, by astronomers of the Near-Earth Asteroid Tracking at the Palomar Observatory in California, United States. This minor planet was named for Crantor from Greek mythology.

Orbit and classification 

Crantor orbits the Sun at a distance of 14.0–24.9 AU once every 85 years and 10 months (31,342 days). Its orbit has a semi-major axis of 19.5 AU, a moderate eccentricity of 0.28, and an inclination of 13° with respect to the ecliptic.

The minor planet was first observed on a precovery taken by the Sloan Digital Sky Survey on 19 March 2001. One night later, the body's observation arc begins with an observation by the Air Force Maui Optical Station (AMOS) at Haleakala Observatory on the island of Hawaii, more than a year prior to its official discovery observation by NEAT.

Co-orbital with Uranus 

Crantor was first suggested as a possible co-orbital of Uranus in 2006. The body follows a complex, transient horseshoe orbit around Uranus. The motion of Crantor is mainly controlled by the influence of the Sun and Uranus, but Saturn has a significant destabilizing effect. The precession of the nodes of Crantor is accelerated by Saturn, controlling its evolution and short-term stability.

Naming 

This minor planet was named after Crantor, a Lapith from Greek mythology. He was killed  in the battle between the Lapiths and the Centaurs by Demoleon, who tore off Crantor's chest and left shoulder with a tree trunk that he had thrown at Theseus, who ducked out of the way (centaur Demoleon is not to be confused with Trojan warrior Demoleon, see 18493 Demoleon). The official naming citation was published by the Minor Planet Center on 15 December 2005.

Physical characteristics 

Water ice has been detected on Crantor with a confidence of more than 3σ (99.7%).

Rotation period 

A fragmentary rotational lightcurve of Crantor was obtained from photometric observations at the Sierra Nevada Observatory in Granada, Spain . Lightcurve analysis gave a rotation period of 13.94 hours with a brightness amplitude of 0.14 magnitude.

Diameter and albedo 

According to the observations by the Herschel Space Telescope with its PACS instrument, Crantor measures  kilometers in diameter and its surface has an albedo of 0.121. The Collaborative Asteroid Lightcurve Link assumes an albedo of 0.10 and derives a diameter of 61.59 kilometers based on an absolute magnitude of 9.17.

See also

References

External links 
 This is an image of Crantor taken by the SDSS telescope on 16APR2002 when it was 13.1au from Earth /Fermats Brother
 Atlas of the mean motion resonances in the Solar System, Gallardo, Tabaré (2006)
 Three centaurs follow Uranus through the solar system (Jun 18, 2013)
 List Of Centaurs and Scattered-Disk Objects – Minor Planet Center
 Asteroid Lightcurve Database (LCDB), query form (info )
 Dictionary of Minor Planet Names, Google books
 Asteroids and comets rotation curves, CdR – Observatoire de Genève, Raoul Behrend
 Discovery Circumstances: Numbered Minor Planets (80001)-(85000) – Minor Planet Center
 
 

Centaurs (small Solar System bodies)
083982
083982
Named minor planets
20020412